The 1982–83 FIRA Trophy was the 23rd edition of a European rugby union championship for national teams.

The tournament was won by Romania, with a Grand Slam. Romania managed to defeat France at home (13-6). The French would finish in a disappointing 4th place, behind Italy and the Soviet Union. Italy reached a brilliant 2nd place, with a draw with France (6-6) at home, and a single loss to Romania (13-6) abroad. 
West Germany finished in 6th place, with five losses, and were relegated. Poland won the Second division and were promoted for the following season.

First division 
The first division returned to the six teams format.

Table

Germany relegated to second division

Results

Second division 
Table

Poland promoted to division 1
Results

Third division 
Table

Czechoslovakia promoted to division 2

Results

Bibliography 
 Francesco Volpe, Valerio Vecchiarelli (2000), 2000 Italia in Meta, Storia della nazionale italiana di rugby dagli albori al Sei Nazioni, GS Editore (2000) .
 Francesco Volpe, Paolo Pacitti (Author), Rugby 2000, GTE Gruppo Editorale (1999).

External links
1982-83 FIRA Trophy at ESPN

1982–83 in European rugby union
1982–83
1983 rugby union tournaments for national teams
1982 rugby union tournaments for national teams